Tempted is a 2001 Australian-French-American thriller film written and directed by Bill Bennett and starring Peter Facinelli, Burt Reynolds and Saffron Burrows.

Premise
A wealthy man married to a beautiful younger woman puts her fidelity to the test.

Cast
 Peter Facinelli as Jimmy Mulate
 Saffron Burrows as Lilly LeBlanc
 Burt Reynolds as Charlie LeBlanc

References

External links
 
 

2001 films
2000s thriller films
Australian thriller films
Films set in New Orleans
Gold Circle Films films
Films directed by Bill Bennett
2000s English-language films
2000s Australian films